Dragones may refer to:
 Dragones, Salta, Argentina
 Dragones, Havana, a ward of Havana, Cuba

See also 
 Dragon (disambiguation)
 Dragoness (disambiguation)